Noga Block (born 2004) is an Israeli rhythmic gymnast who competed at the 2019 Junior World Championships and won the bronze medal for the ball apparatus.

References

External links 

 
 

Living people
2004 births
Israeli rhythmic gymnasts
Medalists at the Junior World Rhythmic Gymnastics Championships